The lac Clair is part of the hydrographic side of the Noire River, in the municipalities of Sainte-Christine-d'Auvergne (East part du lac) and Saint-Alban (western part of the lake), in the MRC of Portneuf Regional County Municipality, in the administrative region of Capitale-Nationale, in province of Quebec, Canada.

The area around Lac Clair is served by Chemin du Lac-Clair which goes around the lake. Forestry is the main economic activity in the sector; recreotourism activities, second.

The surface of Clair Lake is usually frozen from the beginning of December to the end of March, however the safe circulation on the ice is generally done from mid-December to mid-March.

Geography 
The mouth of Lake Clair is located at:
  north-east of the course of the Noire River;
  south-west of the village center of Sainte-Christine-d'Auvergne;
  north of the village center of Saint-Alban;
  north-west of the north-west bank of the St. Lawrence River.

This lake is located entirely in the forest. This lake has five bays, one at each corner of the rectangle, and a fifth on the east side.

Comprising , the Portneuf Regional Natural Park includes lakes Long, Montauban, Carillon, Sept Îles, en Coeur, "À the Eel "and a few other more secondary bodies of water. This park is popular for recreational and tourist activities: hiking trails, boat launching ramp.

The mouth of Clair Lake is located southwest of the lake. From the mouth of the Clair Lake outlet, the current flows over:
  to the south by the Noire River;
  towards the south by the Sainte-Anne River which flows on the northwest bank of the Saint Lawrence river.

Toponymy 
The toponym "Lac Clair" was formalized on December 5, 1968, at the Place Names Bank of the Commission de toponymie du Québec.

References

See also 
 Portneuf Regional County Municipality (MRC)
 Sainte-Christine-d'Auvergne
 Saint-Alban
 Portneuf Regional Natural Park
 Noire River
 Sainte-Anne River
 List of lakes of Canada

Lakes of Capitale-Nationale